Inositol nicotinate, also called inositol hexanicotinate, is marketed in the United States as a "no-flush niacin" dietary supplement. Flushing, in physiology, essentially means that epidermal tissues have become reddened, such as when the skin is irritated from the histamine responses related to an allergic reaction, or from recent physical exercise, or even from anger or embarrassment. 

This form of niacin is supposed to reduce or prevent flushing by being broken down into the metabolites niacin (nicotinic acid) and inositol at a slow rate.

See also 
 Esterification
 Hydrolysis

References

Vasodilators
Nicotinate esters
Inositol